Mamadou Ousmane Jobe (born 2 March 2003) is an English professional footballer who plays as a defender for Maidstone United, on loan from Cambridge United. He has also played on loan at St Neots Town and Concord Rangers.

Career
Jobe came through the Cambridge United youth team and impressed manager Mark Bonner during pre-season training enough to start the 2021–22 campaign as the senior team's third-choice centre-back. He his first-team debut on 31 August 2021, in a 4–1 victory over Oxford United at the Abbey Stadium in the EFL Trophy. On 3 September 2021, he joined St Neots Town of the Southern League Division One Central on loan. On 4 December 2021, he joined National League South club Concord Rangers on loan. On 16 December 2022, Jobe joined National League South side St Albans City on loan for the remainder of the 2022-23 season. In January 2023, he joined National League club Maidstone United on loan.

Career statistics

References

Living people
2003 births
English footballers
Association football defenders
Southern Football League players
National League (English football) players
Cambridge United F.C. players
St Neots Town F.C. players
Concord Rangers F.C. players
St Albans City F.C. players
Maidstone United F.C. players